Canning Town is a London Underground, Docklands Light Railway (DLR) and London Buses station in Canning Town in London, England. It is designed as an intermodal metro and bus station, fully opening in 1999 as part of the Jubilee Line Extension - replacing the original station site north of the A13. On 11 November 2015, the Mayor of London announced that it would be rezoned to be on the boundary of Travelcard Zone 2 and Travelcard Zone 3.

Location 
The interchange is on a north–south alignment, constrained by Bow Creek immediately to the west, Silvertown Way to the east, the A13 Canning Town Flyover (a major east–west road bridge crossing the Canning Town Roundabout at the throat of the station) to the north, and the River Thames to the south.

History 

The first station, originally named Barking Road, was opened on 14 June 1847 by the Eastern Counties and Thames Junction Railway on the south side of Barking Road in the Parish of West Ham. It was renamed Canning Town on 1 July 1873, and in 1888, this station was closed, being replaced by a new station on the north side of Barking Road (near Stephenson Street). The booking hall was replaced in the 1960s, and survived until 28 May 1994. The station was served by trains on the North London line to North Woolwich.

Jubilee Line Extension and Docklands Light Railway 
In the late 1980s, plans for the Docklands Light Railway (DLR) extension to Beckton considered various options - either running directly east/west between Blackwall and Royal Victoria, or following the River Lea to call at Canning Town. In the early 1990s, the planned Jubilee Line Extension station on the site meant that the dedicated DLR station was not built, with a combined interchange station to be built instead. The DLR extension to Beckton began running through the future station site in March 1994.

The new station was built on the south side of the A13, designed by Troughton McAslan. The tiered design of the station placed the DLR platforms directly above the Jubilee line platforms allowing for easy interchange. A substantial bus station was also built as part of the station complex.

On 29 October 1995, the first part of the new station opened, serving the North London Line. The DLR platforms opened on 5 March 1998. With the opening of the Jubilee line platforms on 14 May 1999, the new station complex was complete and officially 'opened'.

The DLR branch to London City Airport opened on 2 December 2005. This branch diverges from the branch to Beckton -mile south of the interchange, with trains from both branches serving the current platforms.

Stratford International DLR extension 
On 31 August 2011 these platforms re-opened on the new Stratford International branch of the Docklands Light Railway.

In October 2019, the station was hit by Extinction Rebellion (XR) protests, causing the suspension of services at rush hour. During the protest, two XR members climbed on top of a train, one appearing to kick commuters who were attempting to remove them. The protest ended when the protesters were grabbed by their ankles, dragged onto the platform and mobbed by the crowd.

Design

Designed by Troughton McAslan, the station is connected by an underground concourse stretching the width of the site and connected to all platforms and the bus station by escalators, stairs and lifts. The station is fully accessible, with step-free access throughout.

To the west of the complex two island platforms are one above the other. The lower level island platform is served by the Jubilee line and the higher level island platform is served by the Beckton and Woolwich Arsenal branches of the DLR. To the east of the Jubilee platforms on the same level, an island platform is served by the Stratford International branch of the DLR. This platform was formerly served by the North London line.

Adjacent to Silvertown Way, on the eastern side of the interchange is a bus station with seven stands, with an enclosed above-ground concourse with doors to the surrounding bus bays. The bus station is fully connected to the DLR and Underground platforms via the underground concourse.

As well as entrances onto Silvertown Way and Barking Road, an entrance facing Bow Creek allows access to London City Island, Bow Creek Ecology Park and the Limmo Peninsula. This entrance was built as part of the JLE project in the late 1990s, but opened in 2016.

Artwork 

Carved into the walls of a station staircase, an artwork by Richard Kindersley commemorates the Thames Iron Works, which previously stood on the site. It was unveiled in February 1998 by then-Archbishop of Canterbury George Carey, who grew up in the local area.

Services

London Underground
The typical off-peak service, in trains per hour (tph) is:
18tph eastbound to Stratford
12tph westbound to Stanmore
6tph westbound to Wembley Park

Night Tube services run every 10 minutes on the entire line on Friday and Saturday nights.

 6 tph Stanmore – Stratford

Docklands Light Railway
The typical off-peak service is; in trains per hour (tph) is:

12tph westbound to Bank or Tower Gateway
12tph eastbound to Beckton
6tph westbound to Stratford International
6tph eastbound to Woolwich Arsenal.

In the peak hours the pattern is:
15tph westbound to Bank or Tower Gateway
7.5tph eastbound to Beckton
7.5tph westbound to Stratford International
15tph eastbound to Woolwich Arsenal.

Buses
London Buses routes 5, 69, 115, 147, 300, 309, 323, 330, 474 and night routes N15, N550 and N551 serve the station.

References

External links

Docklands Light Railway website - Canning Town station page
Photograph of one of the Jubilee line platforms

Docklands Light Railway stations in the London Borough of Newham
Jubilee line stations
London Underground Night Tube stations
Tube stations in the London Borough of Newham
Transport architecture in London
Railway stations in Great Britain opened in 1847
Former Eastern Counties and Thames Junction Railway stations
Bus stations in London
Station
1847 establishments in England